Rudbar (also Romanized as Rūdbār) is a village in Chashm Rural District, Shahmirzad District, Mehdishahr County, Semnan Province, Iran. As of the 2006 census, its population was 213, in 52 families.

References 

Populated places in Mehdishahr County